The far-right tradition in France finds its origins in the Third Republic with Boulangism and the Dreyfus affair. The modern "far right" or radical right grew out of two separate events of 1889: the splitting off in the Socialist International of those who chose the nation and the culmination of the "Boulanger Affair", which championed the demands of the former Minister of War General Georges Boulanger. The Dreyfus Affair provided one of the political division lines of France. Nationalism, which had been before the Dreyfus Affair a left-wing and Republican ideology, turned after that to be a main trait of the right-wing and, moreover, of the far right. A new right emerged, and nationalism was reappropriated by the far right who turned it into a form of ethnic nationalism, itself blended with anti-Semitism, xenophobia, anti-Protestantism and anti-Masonry. The Action française, first founded as a review, was the matrix of a new type of counter-revolutionary right-wing, and continues to exist today. During the interwar period, the Action française (AF) and its youth militia, the Camelots du Roi, were very active. Far right leagues organized riots.

The Organisation armée secrète (OAS) was created in Madrid by French military opposed to the independence of Algeria. 
Jean-Marie Le Pen founded the Front National (FN) party in 1972. At the 1986 legislative elections, the FN managed to obtain 35 seats, with 10% of the votes. Mark Frederiksen, a French Algeria activist, created in April 1966 a neo-Nazi group, the FANE (Fédération d'action nationaliste et européenne, Nationalist and European Federation of Action). However, in 1978, neo-Nazi members of the GNR-FANE broke again with the FN. During the 1980s, the National Front managed to gather, under Jean-Marie Le Pen's leadership, most rival far-right tendencies of France, following a succession of splits and alliances with other, minor parties, during the 1970s.

Third Republic (1871–1914) 

The Dreyfus Affair was a turning point in the political history of France and in the Third Republic (1871–1940), established after the 1870 Franco-Prussian War and the 1871 Paris Commune. The modern "far right" or radical right, grew out of two separate events of 1889.

The Socialist International was formed at the Paris Conference, which imposed doctrinal orthodoxy on socialists and demanded their allegiance to the international working class rather than their nation. This forced patriotic socialists to choose either their nation or the international workers' movement. Many chose their nation and fell into violent conflict with their former socialist comrades. Those who chose the nation and retained the strategy of violence, then used most often against their former comrades, formed much of the base of the radical right. Many of those people also proved susceptible to the blandishments of anti-Semitism, which has long been a hallmark of the radical right. This would include (socialist) Maurice Barrès, (communardes) Henri Rochefort and Gustave Paul Cluseret, (Blanquists) Charles Bernard and Antoine Jourde, among others.

A second event of 1889 was the culmination of the "Boulanger Affair" which championed the vague demands of the former Minister of War General Georges Boulanger. Boulanger had attracted the support of many socialists by ordering lenient treatment of strikers when the army was called upon to suppress strikes. He also rattled his saber against Germany, which pleased French patriots intent on taking revenge. But this alarmed the other ministers, who dropped Boulanger from the government. When his champions mounted an electoral campaign to have him elected to the Chamber of Deputies, the government reacted by forcing him out of the Army. His backers then elected him to the Chamber again from Paris, where he gained the support of both conservatives, who loathed the Republic, and socialists with their own ideas about how the Republic should be remade. This joining of the left and right against the center formed the foundation upon which the radical right was built in subsequent years. Violent agitation in Paris on the election night in 1889 convinced the government to prosecute Boulanger in order to remove him from the political scene. Instead of facing trumped up charges, Boulanger fled to Belgium. His supporters, "Boulangists" afterward nursed an intense grievance against the Republic and reunited during the Dreyfus Affair to oppose the Republic and "back the army" once again.

Dreyfus Affair and foundation of the Action française 

In 1894, a Jewish officer, Alfred Dreyfus, was arrested on accusations of treason and sharing intelligence with the German Empire. The Dreyfus Affair provided one of the political fault lines of France. Nationalism, which had been before the Dreyfus Affair a left-wing and Republican ideology, turned after that to be a main trait of the right-wing and, moreover, of the far right.

Émile Zola entered the political scene with his open letter "J'Accuse…!", followed by other writers, artists and scholars supporting him with a "Manifesto of the Intellectuals", helping to define the meaning of the term "intellectual", while the left and right were at loggerheads, mainly over the questions of militarism, nationalism, justice and human rights. Until then, nationalism was a Republican, left-wing ideology, related to the French Revolution and the Revolutionary Wars. It was a liberal nationalism, formulated by Ernest Renan's definition of the nation as a "daily plebiscite" and as formed by the subjective "will to live together." Related to "revanchism", the belligerent will to take revenge against Germany and retake control of Alsace-Lorraine, nationalism could then be sometimes opposed to imperialism. In the 1880s, a debate thus opposed those who opposed the "colonial lobby", such as radical Georges Clemenceau, who declared that colonialism diverted France from the "blue line of the Vosges" (referring to Alsace-Lorraine), socialist Jean Jaurès and nationalist Maurice Barrès, against Moderate Republican Jules Ferry, republican Léon Gambetta and Eugène Etienne, the president of the parliamentary colonial group.

However, in the midst of the Dreyfus Affair, a new right emerged, and nationalism was appropriated by the far right who turned it into a form of ethnic nationalism, itself blended with anti-Semitism, xenophobia, anti-Protestantism and anti-Masonry. Charles Maurras (1868–1952), founder of "integralism" (or "integral nationalism"), created the term "Anti-France" to stigmatize "internal foreigners", or the "four confederate states of Protestants, Jews, Freemasons and foreigners" (his actual word for the latter being the far less polite métèques). A few years later, Maurras would join the monarchist Action française, created by Maurice Pujo and Henri Vaugeois in 1898. Maurras, who was an agnostic, spearheaded a monarchist and Catholic revival. He pragmatically conceived of religion as an ideology useful to unify the nation. Most French Catholics were conservatives, a trait that continues today. On the other hand, most Protestants, Jews and atheists belonged to the left. Henceforth, the Republicans' conception was, to the contrary, that only state secularism could peacefully bind together diverse religious and philosophical tendencies, and avoid any return to the Wars of Religion. Furthermore, Catholic priests were seen as a major reactionary force by the Republicans, among whom anti-clericalism became common. The Ferry laws on public education had been a first step for the Republic in rooting out the clerics' influence: they would be completed by the 1905 law on the separation of Church and State.

Action française, first founded as a review, was the matrix of a new type of counter-revolutionary right-wing, and continues to exist today. Action française was quite influential in the 1930s, in particular through its youth organization, the Camelots du Roi, founded in 1908, and which engaged in many street brawls, etc. The Camelots du Roi included such figures as Catholic writer Georges Bernanos and Jean de Barrau, member of the directing committee of the National Federation, and particular secretary of the duc d'Orléans (1869–1926), the son of the Orleanist count of Paris (1838–1894) and hence Orleanist heir to the throne of France. Many members of the OAS terrorist group during the Algerian War (1954–62) were part of the monarchist movement. Jean Ousset, Maurras' personal secretary, created the Catholic fundamentalist organization Cité catholique, which would include OAS members and founded a branch in Argentina in the 1960s.

Apart from the Action française, several far-right leagues were created during the Dreyfus Affair. Mostly anti-Semitic, they also represented a new right-wing tendency, sharing common traits such as anti-parliamentarism, militarism, nationalism, and often engaged in street brawls. Thus, the nationalist poet Paul Déroulède created in 1882 the anti-semitic Ligue des patriotes (League of Patriots), which at first focused on advocating 'revanche' (revenge) for the French defeat during the Franco-Prussian War. Along with Jules Guérin, the journalist Edouard Drumont created the Antisemitic League of France in 1889. Also anti-masonic, the League became at the start of the 20th century the Grand Occident de France, a name chosen in reaction against the masonic lodge of the Grand Orient de France.

Between the wars 
During the interwar period, the Action française (AF) and its youth militia, the Camelots du Roi, were very active in Paris.  Apart from the AF, various far-right leagues were formed and opposed both Cartel des gauches (Coalition of the left) governments. Pierre Taittinger thus formed the Jeunesses Patriotes in 1924, which imitated the style of the Fascists, although it remained a more traditional authoritarian movement. The following year, Georges Valois created Le Faisceau, heavily inspired by Benito Mussolini's Fascism. In 1933, the year Adolf Hitler gained power in Germany, perfumer François Coty founded Solidarité française and Marcel Bucard formed the Francisme, which was subsidised by Mussolini. Another important league was François de la Rocque's Croix de Feu, which formed the base for the Parti Social Français (PSF), the first mass party of the French right-wing.  Mussolini was much more popular in right-wing circles than Hitler due to the negative reaction many French conservatives had to Hitler's repression of dissident German conservatives and Catholics in 1933 and 1934.

Apart from the leagues, a group of Neosocialists (Marcel Déat, Pierre Renaudel, etc.) were excluded in November 1933 from the French Section of the Workers' International (SFIO, the socialist party) because of their revisionist stances and admiration for fascism. Déat would become one of the most ardent collaborationists during World War II.

Another major player in France's right-wing world between the wars was Jacques Doriot. Doriot had been expelled by the French Communist Party after proposing a Popular Front with other leftist parties, which at that time was seen as heresy by his party's hierarchy. Personally hurt and embittered by his expulsion, Doriot would slowly change sides, eventually openly denouncing communism and going on to found the Parti Populaire Francais or PPF, the largest pre-war right wing party. Other important figures of the 1930s include Xavier Vallat, who would become General Commissioner for Jewish Affairs under Vichy, members of the Cagoule terrorist group (Eugène Deloncle, Eugène Schueller (the founder of L'Oréal cosmetic firm), Jacques Corrèze, Joseph Darnand, who later founded the Service d'ordre légionnaire militia during Vichy, etc.). To obtain arms from fascist Italy, the group assassinated two Italian antifascists, the Rosselli brothers, on June 9, 1937, and sabotaged aeroplanes clandestinely supplied by the French government to the Second Spanish Republic. They also attempted a coup against the Popular Front government, elected in 1936, leading to arrests in 1937, ordered by Interior Minister Marx Dormoy, during which the police seized explosives and military weapons, including anti-tank guns.

Far right leagues organised major riots on 6 February 1934. The groups did not coordinate their efforts and the riots were suppressed by the police and military.  Elements on the left were convinced that uniots was essential to suppress fascism, and in 1936 they formed the Popular Front and dissolved the leagues.  However the right-wing leagues promptly reorganized as political parties and continued vocal attacks on the left.

Vichy France

Fifth Republic 
The Organisation armée secrète (OAS) was created in Madrid by French military officers opposed to the independence of Algeria. Many of its members would later join various anti-communist struggles around the world. Some, for example, joined the Cité catholique fundamentalist group and went to Argentina, where they were in contact with the Argentine Armed Forces. Jean Pierre Cherid, former OAS member, took part in the 1976 Montejurra massacre against left-wing Carlists. He was then part of the Spanish GAL death squad, and participated in the 1978 assassination of Argala, one of the ETA members who had killed Franco's Prime minister, Luis Carrero Blanco, in 1973.

Jean-Louis Tixier-Vignancour was the far-right candidate at the 1965 presidential election. His campaign was organised by Jean-Marie Le Pen. Charles de Gaulle said of Tixier-Vignancourt: "Tixier-Vignancour, that is Vichy, the Collaboration proud of itself, the Milice, the OAS".

Jean-Marie Le Pen founded the Front National (FN) party in 1972, along with former Occident member Jacques Bompard, former Collaborationist Roland Gaucher, François Duprat, who introduced the negationist thesis to France, and others nostalgics of Vichy France, Catholic fundamentalists, etc. Le Pen presented himself for the first time in the 1974 presidential election, obtaining 0.74%. The electoral rise of the FN did not start until Jean-Pierre Stirbois's victory, in 1983, in Dreux. The FN became stronger throughout the 1980s, managing to unite most far-right tendencies, passing electoral alliances with the right-wing Rally for the Republic (RPR), while some FN members quit the party to join the RPR or the Union for a French Democracy (UDF). At the 1986 legislative elections, the FN managed to obtain 35 seats, with 10% of the votes.

Meanwhile, other far-right tendencies gathered in Alain de Benoist's Nouvelle Droite think-tank, heading a pro-European and neopagan line. Some radical members of the "national revolutionary" tendency quit the FN to form other minor parties (Party of New Forces, PFN, and French and European Nationalist Party, PNFE).

French Third Position's relations with the National Front 

Mark Frederiksen, a French Algeria activist, created in April 1966 a neo-Nazi group, the FANE (Fédération d'action nationaliste et européenne, Nationalist and European Federation of Action). The FANE boasted at most a hundred activists, including members such as Luc Michel, now leader of the Parti communautaire national-européen (National European Communautary Party), Jacques Bastide, Michel Faci, Michel Caignet and Henri-Robert Petit, a journalist and former Collaborationist who directed under the Vichy regime the newspaper Le Pilori. The FANE maintained international contacts with the British group the League of Saint George.

The FANE rallied Jean-Marie Le Pen's National Front in 1974, gathered around François Duprat and Alain Renault's Revolutionary Nationalist Groups (GNR), which represented the nationalist revolutionary tendency of the FN.

But in 1978, neo-Nazi members of the GNR-FANE broke again with the FN, taking with them sections of the FN youth movement, the Front National de la Jeunesse. On the other hand, GNR activists closer to the Third Position (Jacques Bastide and Patrick Gorre) joined Jean-Gilles Malliarakis to found, on February 11, 1979, the Revolutionary Nationalist Movement (Mouvement nationaliste révolutionnaire), which became in 1985 Third Way (Troisième Voie).

After this brief passage at the National Front, Mark Fredriksen created the Faisceaux nationalistes européens (FANE) in July 1980. These would eventually merge with the Mouvement national et social ethniste in 1987, and then with the PNFE (French and European Nationalist Party) in January 1994, which also gathered former National Front members.

Dissolved first in September 1980 by Raymond Barre's government, Fredriksen's group was recreated, and dissolved again in 1985 by Laurent Fabius' government. Finally, it was dissolved a third time in 1987 by Jacques Chirac's government, on charges of "violent demonstrations organised by this movement, which has as one of its expressed objective the establishment of a new Nazi regime," the "paramilitary organisation of this association and its inciting of racial discrimination."

Alain de Benoist's Nouvelle Droite and the Club de l'Horloge 
In the 1980s, Alain de Benoist became chief theorist of the Nouvelle Droite movement, creating the think-tank GRECE in 1968, some of whose members were involved with the formation of the Club de l'Horloge in 1974. They advocated an ethno-nationalist stance focused on European culture, which advocated a return of paganism. Members of the GRECE quit the think tank in the 1980s, such as Pierre Vial who joined the FN, or Guillaume Faye who quit the organisation along with others members in 1986. Faye participated in 2006 in a conference in the US organised by American Renaissance, a white separatist magazine published by the New Century Foundation.

Alain de Benoist occasionally contributed to the Mankind Quarterly review, which supports hereditarianism and is associated with the US think tank the Pioneer Fund, headed by J. Philippe Rushton, the author of Race, Evolution and Behavior (1995), which argues in favour of a biological conception of "race". GRECE and the Pioneer Fund are actively involved in the race and intelligence debate, postulating that there is an identifiable link between levels of intelligence and distinct ethnic groups.

The Club de l'horloge itself had been founded by Henry de Lesquen, a former member of the conservative Rally for the Republic, which he quit in 1984. Others members of the Club de l'horloge, such as Bruno Mégret, later joined the FN after a short time in the RPR.

Rise of the National Front in the 1980s and Mégret's split 
During the 1980s, the National Front managed to gather, under Jean-Marie Le Pen's leadership, most rival far-right tendencies of France, following a succession of splits and alliances with other, minor parties, during the 1970s.

Party of New Forces 
One of those parties, the Party of New Forces (PFN, Parti des forces nouvelles), was an offshoot of the National Front, formed from a 1973 split headed by Alain Robert and François Brigneau who first organised the Comité faire front which subsequently merged into the PFN.

The PFN was formed mainly by former members of New Order (Ordre nouveau, 1969–1973), who had refused to merge into the FN at its 1972 creation. New Order, dissolved by Interior Minister Raymond Marcellin in 1973, was itself a successor to Occident (1964–1968) and of the Union Defense Group (GUD, Groupe union défense).

Close to the Third Position and supporting a "national-revolutionary" thesis, this tendency maintained links with the FN, despite some tensions. The GUD, in particular, had published the satiric monthly Alternative with the Youth Front (Front de la jeunesse), the youth organisation of the FN. They also had attempted alliances with other far-right parties in Europe, with New Order organising the alliance "A Fatherland for Tomorrow" (Une patrie pour demain) with the Spanish Falange, the Italian Social Movement (MSI) and the German National Democratic Party.

This European strategy was continued by the PFN, who launched the Euroright alliance, with the MSI, the Spanish New Force and the Belgian PFN, for the 1979 European elections. Headed by Jean-Louis Tixier-Vignancour, the PFN won 1.3% of the vote. This electoral failure prompted Roland Gaucher and François Brigneau to quit the party and join Le Pen's National Front.

1981 presidential election 
The French far-right was divided in the 1981 presidential election, with both Pascal Gauchon (PFN) and Le Pen (FN) attempting, without success, to secure the 500 signatures from mayors necessary to stand as candidates. François Mitterrand (Socialist Party) won those elections, competing against Jacques Chirac (Rally for the Republic, RPR).

1983 elections and rise 
These succeeding electoral defeats prompted the far-right to unify itself. In 1983, the FN managed to make its first electoral breakthrough, taking control of the town of Dreux: Jean-Pierre Stirbois obtained 17% of the votes in the first round, for the FN municipal list. In the second round, he merged his list with Chirac's RPR list (headed by Jean Hieaux), enabling the right to claim a victory against the left. Chirac supported the alliance with the far-right, claiming that the Socialist Party, allied with the Communist Party in government, had no lessons to give.

This first electoral success was confirmed at the 1984 European elections, the FN obtaining 10% of the votes. Two years later, the FN gained 35 deputies (nearly 10% of the votes) at the 1986 legislative elections, running under the label of "Rassemblement national. Those elected included the monarchist Georges-Paul Wagner.

Internal disputes continued however to divide the far-right. Following the 1986 elections, which brought Jacques Chirac to power as Prime Minister, some hardliners inside the FN broke away to create the French and European Nationalist Party (PNFE, Parti Nationaliste Français et Européen), along with members of Mark Frederiksen's Third Position FANE. Three former members of the PNFE were charged of having desecrated, in 1990, a Jewish cemetery in Carpentras. The PNFE was also implicated in the 1988 Cannes and Nice attacks.

Mégret's split, Le Pen's 2002 score and subsequent electoral fall 
The most important split, however, was headed by Bruno Mégret in 1999. Taking many FN elected representatives and party officials with him, he then created the National Republican Movement (MNR). However, with an eye to the 2007 legislative elections, he supported Le Pen's candidacy for the presidential election.

During these presidential elections, Jean-Marie Le Pen only took 10.4% of the vote, compared to his 16.9% first round result in 2002, qualifying him for the second round, where he achieved 17.79% against 82.21% for Jacques Chirac (Rally for the Republic, RPR).

With only 1.85% in the second round of the 2002 legislative elections, the FN failed to gain any seats in the National Assembly. In the 2007 presidential election, Le Pen finished fourth, behind Nicolas Sarkozy, Ségolène Royal and François Bayrou. Philippe de Villiers, the Catholic traditionalist candidate of the Movement for France (especially strong in the conservative Vendée region), was sixth, obtaining 2.23% of the vote.

This electoral slump for the FN was confirmed at the 2007 legislative elections, the FN obtaining only 0.08% of the votes in the second round, and therefore no seats.

Le Pen's succession 

These electoral defeats, which contrasted with the high score obtained at the 2002 presidential elections, caused financial problems for the FN, which was forced to sell its headquarters, the Paquebot, in Saint-Cloud. Le Pen then announced, in 2008, that he would not compete again in presidential elections, leaving the way for contest for the leadership of the FN between his daughter, Marine Le Pen, whom he favoured,  and Bruno Gollnisch. The latter had been condemned in January 2007 for Holocaust denial, while Marine Le Pen attempted to follow a slicker strategy to give the FN a more "respectable" image.

FN 2010s surge 
Since her election as the leader of the party in 2011, the popularity of the FN continued to grow apace as the party won several municipalities at the 2014 municipal elections; it topped the poll in France at the 2014 European elections with 25% of the vote; and again won more votes than any other party in the 2015 departmental elections. The party once again came in first place in the 2015 regional elections with a historic result of just under 28% of the vote. By 2015, the FN had established itself as one of the largest political forces in France, unusually being both most popular and most controversial political party.

For the 2012 presidential election, Le Pen came third in the first round, scoring 17.9% – the partys then best showing ever for the FN.

For the 2017 presidential election, Le Pen came second in the first round, scoring 21.3% – the best showing ever for the FN. in the second round she came second with 33.9% a best for NF.

In 2018, the National Front was renamed National Rally.

2020s
In the run up to the 2022 presidential election, Éric Zemmour, a noted far-right pundit with no previous party affiliation or political experience, created his own party, Reconquête,  and overtook Le Pen in the polls.

For the 2022 presidential election, Le Pen came second in the first round, scoring 23.15% – the best showing ever for the RN. Zemmour got 7.07%. Total Far Right vote was 32%, the highest vote ever in a French election.

Le Pen came second in the second round, scoring 41.46% – the best showing ever for the RN or for a Far Right candidate.

In the June 2022 Assemblée Nationale election, the RN gained 89 seats in the national assembly,winning the party enough seats to form a parliamentary group for the first time since 1986.

Individuals and groups

Individuals
Raymond Abellio
Marc Augier
Jacques Bainville
Maurice Barrès
René Benjamin
Jacques Benoist-Méchin
Henri Béraud
Abel Bonnard
Paul Bourget
Pierre Boutang
Robert Brasillach
Renaud Camus
Louis-Ferdinand Céline
Jacques Chardonne
Alphonse de Châteaubriant
Léon Daudet
Pierre Drieu La Rochelle
Édouard Drumont
André Fraigneau
Pierre Gaxotte
Pierre Gripari
Kléber Haedens
Marcel Jouhandeau
Jacques de Lacretelle
Jean Mabire
Henri Massis
Thierry Maulnier
Charles Maurras
Jean-Pierre Maxence
Henry de Monfreid
Lucien Rebatet
Hugues Rebell
Paul Sérant
Pierre Sidos
Alain Soral
Georges Vacher de Lapouge
Dominique Venner
Pierre Vial
Éric Zemmour

Other minor groups 
Other minor groups that are or have been active in the Fifth Republic include:
Groupe Union Défense is French far-right student association
Bastion Social is a nationalist youth movement
Unité Radicale (one of its members, Maxime Brunerie, tried to assassinate President Jacques Chirac in 2002)
Les Identitaires, formerly Bloc identitaire, an offshoot of Unité Radicale, dissolved after Brunerie's assassination attempt, which publicly distributes so-called "identity soups" ("soupes identitaires"), that is "popular soups" with pork in order to exclude religious Jews and Muslims from them.
Parti Nationaliste Français et Européen (PNFE), a Pan-European nationalist group with which Brunerie was also associated.
Parti des forces nouvelles, formed from an early anti-Le Pen faction of the Front National.
Réseau Radical, a study group.
Troisième Voie, a Third Position movement with links to the far right student movement Groupe Union Défense.

See also 
Rock identitaire français
Breton Social-National Workers' Movement

References

Bibliography 
 Davies, Peter. The National Front in France. Ideology, Discourse and Power (Routledge, 1999)
 Fuller, Robert Lynn.  The Origins of the French Nationalist Movement, 1886-1914 (McFarland, 2012)
 Hainsworth, Paul. "The Extreme Right in France: From Pétain to Le Pen." Modern & Contemporary France (2012) 20#3 pp: 392-392. abstract
 Hutton, Patrick. "Popular Boulangism and the Advent of Mass Politics in France, 1886-90" Journal of Contemporary History (1976) 11#1 pp. 85–106 in JSTOR
 Irvine, William. The Boulanger Affair Reconsidered, Royalism, Boulangism, and the Origins of the Radical Right in France (Oxford University Press, 1989)
 Irvine, William D. French Conservatism in Crisis: The Republican Federation of France in the 1930s (1979).
 Kalman, Samuel, and Sean Kennedy, eds. The French Right Between the Wars: Political and Intellectual Movements From Conservatism to Fascism (Berghahn Books; 2014) 264 pages; scholars examine such topics as veterans and the extreme right, female right-wing militancy, and visions of masculinity in the natalist-familialist movement.

 Millington, Chris. A History of Fascism in France: From the First World War to the National Front (Bloomsbury, 2019) online review
 Passmore, Kevin. "The Historiography of 'Fascism' in France," French Historical Studies 37 (2014): 469-499
 Passmore, Kevin. The Right in France from the Third Republic to Vichy (Oxford University Press, 2013)
 Russo, Luana. "France: The historic victory of the Front National." in The European Parliament Elections of 2014 (2014): 181-88 online
 Shields, James. "Marine Le Pen and the ‘New’ FN: A Change of Style or of Substance?." Parliamentary affairs (2013) 66#1 pp: 179–196. abstract
 Weber, Eugen. L'Action Française, Royalism and Reaction in Twentieth-Century France (Stanford University Press, 1962)
 Winock, Michel. Nationalism, anti-semitism, and fascism in France (Stanford University Press, 1998)

In French
 Bertrand Joly, Nationalistes et Conservateurs en France, 1885-1902 (Les Indes Savantes, 2008)
Winock, Michel (dir.), Histoire de l'extrême droite en France (1993)

 
Political history of France
History of political thought